Ruff Town Behavior is the third studio album by American hip hop group Poison Clan. It was released on June 25, 1993 via Luke Records, making it the group's final record for the label. Production was handled by Mike "Fresh" McCray, Professor Griff, and Swift, with Luther Campbell serving as executive producer.

The album was Poison Clan's most successful album, having made it to #97 on the Billboard 200, #12 on the Top R&B/Hip-Hop Albums and #12 on the Top Heatseekers. However it featured just one charting single, "Put Shit Pass No Ho", which made it to #94 on the Hot R&B/Hip-Hop Singles & Tracks.

Track listing

Charts

References

External links

1993 albums
Poison Clan albums
Luke Records albums